The 1982–83 St. Francis Terriers men's basketball team represented St. Francis College during the 1982–83 NCAA Division I men's basketball season. The team was coached by Gene Roberti, who was in his fourth year at the helm of the St. Francis Terriers. The Terrier's home games were played at the  Generoso Pope Athletic Complex. The team has been a member of the Northeast Conference since 1981, although at this time the conference was known as the ECAC Metro Conference. Also at this time the conference had 2 divisions, north and south, with St. Francis being in the north division.

The Terriers finished their season at 10–18 overall and 7–7 in conference play.

Roster

Schedule and results

|-
!colspan=12 style="background:#0038A8; border: 2px solid #CE1126;;color:#FFFFFF;"| Regular season

   

  

 
   

  

  
 

   

  
|-
!colspan=12 style="background:#0038A8; border: 2px solid #CE1126;;color:#FFFFFF;"| ECAC Metro tournament

source

References

St. Francis Brooklyn Terriers men's basketball seasons
St. Francis
St. Francis Brooklyn Terriers men's basketball
St. Francis Brooklyn Terriers men's basketball